Carlheim (also called Paxton) is a mansion located in the northeast part of Leesburg, Virginia. It was constructed in about 1872 for Pennsylvania industrialist Charles R. Paxton (1816–1889) and his wife Rachel who continued to live there until her death in December 1921. When constructed, it sat on over  roughly bounded on the north end by the Red Rock Wilderness Overlook Regional Park, the Balls Bluff Battlefield and the Potomac River. In accordance with Mrs. Paxton's will, the buildings and 50 surrounding acres were preserved and organized into a charitable trust to benefit "needy children."

Designed by New York architect Henry Dudley, the nearly  32-room Second Empire building was listed on the National Register of Historic Places in 1979 for its architectural and local significance. In 2004, the property became a non-contiguous part of the Leesburg Historic District. The estate of Mr. and Mrs. Paxton was originally entered down a long tree lined driveway off of King Street. Today, that entrance is gone and there are two more contemporary entrances; Wildman Street (normally closed) and the new main entrance that was completed in 2009 at 601 Catoctin Circle.

Among the buildings that remain from the original estate but are outside the present campus include the Farm Managers Home (now the Exeter Community Club House) and the stabilized creamery ruins at Red Rock Park along Edwards Ferry Road.

The mansion and remaining  grounds are currently the home of The Arc of Loudoun, Northern Virginia's premier advocacy, education and therapy organization dedicated to serving people with disabilities and their families. The Arc's constituents encompass all ages and ranges of intellectual/developmental disabilities (I/DD), cognitive impairments, and other neurodevelopmental disorders (to include Autism Spectrum Disorder, Down Syndrome, and Fragile X); and/or neurophysical injuries and dysfunctions (to include spinal cord and brain injuries, stroke, Multiple Sclerosis, Parkinson's Disease, cerebral palsy, and balance disorders).

The Arc's onsite programs include Ability Fitness Center, Aurora Behavior Clinic, Aurora School, A Life Like Yours ALLY Advocacy Center, and Open Door Learning Center. The Campus is privately owned property but holds several events open to the general public.

The major annual fundraising events on the property include:

Music at the Manor free concert series (May)
Shocktober Haunted House (One of The Scariest Haunted Houses in the US) (October)
My Bloody Valentine Haunted House (February)

References

External links
The Arc of Loudoun
Ability Fitness Center
ALLY Advocacy Center
Aurora Behavior Clinic
The Aurora School
Open Door Learning Center
The Arc of Loudoun Facebook

Second Empire architecture in Virginia
Houses on the National Register of Historic Places in Virginia
Houses in Loudoun County, Virginia
Houses completed in 1872
National Register of Historic Places in Loudoun County, Virginia
Individually listed contributing properties to historic districts on the National Register in Virginia
Leesburg, Virginia